Lake Butler, Florida may refer to the following places:

 Lake Butler, Orange County, Florida
 Lake Butler, Union County, Florida